is a Japanese horticulturalist.

Books
with Dan Pearson Tokachi Millennium Forest: Pioneering a New Way of Gardening with Nature (Filbert Press, 2021)

References

Year of birth missing (living people)
Living people
Horticulturists
Women horticulturists and gardeners